The Jammu and Kashmir Peoples Democratic Party (PDP) is a state political party in Jammu and Kashmir, India. The PDP was headed and founded by Mufti Mohammed Sayeed. His daughter, Mehbooba Mufti, succeeded him as party leader and as Chief Minister of Jammu and Kashmir following his death in January 2016. The party is a member of the People's Alliance for Gupkar Declaration electoral alliance.

History 

The PDP was founded in 1999 by the former Union Home Minister Mufti Mohammed Sayeed. It captured power in Jammu and Kashmir in October 2002 Assembly elections. In 2004 it had one member each in the Lok Sabha and in the Rajya Sabha. It was a member of the ruling United Progressive Alliance until the 2009 general election.

Sayeed headed the PDP-Indian National Congress Coalition Government between October 2002 and November 2005, and he was the party's Patron until his death on 7 January 2016. The PDP is now headed by Mehbooba Mufti, Sayeed's daughter.

The PDP operates on the ideology of self-rule, as distinctly different from the issues of autonomy. It believes that self-rule as a political philosophy, as opposed to autonomy, ensures the empowerment of the people of Jammu and Kashmir, while further engaging in debates over new political territoriality of Jammu and Kashmir.

In the 2014 general election, three of its members were elected to the Lok Sabha. Its strength in the Legislative Assembly is 28 and in the Rajya Sabha is two. The party ran a Coalition government in Jammu and Kashmir with the Bharatiya Janata Party until the BJP abandoned the coalition on June 19, 2018, due to concerns about terrorism and radicalization in Kashmir.

Election results

List of Chief Ministers

Chief Ministers of Jammu And Kashmir

Deputy Chief Ministers of Jammu And Kashmir

See also
Jammu and Kashmir National Conference
Jammu and Kashmir Apni Party
Jammu and Kashmir Workers Party
 Ikkjutt Jammu 
 Politics of Jammu and Kashmir 
 Bharatiya Janata Party
 Indian National Congress
 Jammu and Kashmir People's Conference

References

External links

 Official Website
 Jammu and Kashmir Peoples Democratic Party at Elections.in

 
State political parties in Jammu and Kashmir
Political parties established in 1999
1999 establishments in Jammu and Kashmir
Political parties in India